The 2017–18 La Salle Explorers women's basketball team will represent La Salle University during the 2017–18 NCAA Division I women's basketball season. The Explorers, led by eighth year head coach Jeff Williams, play their home games at Tom Gola Arena and were members of the Atlantic 10 Conference. They finished the season 8–22, 3–13 in A-10 play to finish in a tie for eleventh place. They lost in the first round of the A-10 women's tournament to George Washington.

On March 2, Jeff Williams's contract was not renewed. He finished at La Salle with an 8-year record of 92–149.

Media

La Salle Explorers Sports Network
Select Explorers games will be broadcast online by the La Salle Portal. The A-10 Digital Network will carry all non-televised Explorers home games and most conference road games.

Roster

Schedule

|-
!colspan=9 style="background:#; color:white;"| Regular season

|-
!colspan=9 style="background:#; color:white;"| Atlantic 10 Women's Tournament

Rankings
2017–18 NCAA Division I women's basketball rankings

See also
 2017–18 La Salle Explorers men's basketball team

References

La Salle
La Salle Explorers women's basketball seasons
La Salle
La Salle